Midtown Chicago may refer to:

 Lincoln Park, Chicago, a "community area" in the American city of Chicago, Illinois, or more specifically;
 Midtown North District, a historic district in the Lincoln Park community area of Chicago
 Lake View, Chicago, another "community area"